Godar Pahn (also Romanized as Godār Pahn; also known as Godār Chaman) is a village in Soltanabad Rural District, in the Central District of Ramhormoz County, Khuzestan Province, Iran. At the 2006 census, its population was 138, in 27 families.

References 

Populated places in Ramhormoz County